Andrew Ziemer is a retired American soccer player who played professionally in the USISL A-League.

Youth
Growing up, Ziemer played for several amateur clubs.  These include the Dixie Stompers (1983–85), Santa Rosa United (1986), Fresno Oro (1986-1987), Sons of Italy (1988) and Greek-American A.C. (1989-1994).  Ziemer also played college soccer beginning with the Fresno State Bulldogs in 1986.  In 1988, he transferred to Santa Rosa Junior College.  In 1989, Ziemer left college to pursue a career in Europe.  He signed with the amateur 1. FC Recklinghausen of the Regionalliga.  In 1990, Ziemer returned to the United States to finish his collegiate career with two seasons of NCAA Division II soccer at Sonoma State University where he is second on the career goals list with 42 and third on the career assists list with 24.  He was also a 1990 Division II NCAA All American.  In 1991, Sonoma State finished runner-up in the NCAA Division II Men's Soccer Championship.  In 2002, Sonoma State inducted Ziemer into its Athletic Hall of Fame.

Professional
In 1994, Ziemer turned professional with the North Bay Breakers in the USISL.  In 1995, he moved to the California Jaguars.

References

External links
 Andrew Ziemer

Living people
1967 births
American soccer players
American expatriate soccer players
California Jaguars players
North Bay Breakers players
Fresno State Bulldogs men's soccer players
USISL players
USL League Two players
A-League (1995–2004) players
Soccer players from San Francisco
Association football midfielders